Box of Chameleons is a three-disc compilation album by American experimental rock band Sun City Girls, released in 1997 by Abduction Records.

Track listing

Personnel
Adapted from the Box of Chameleons liner notes.

Sun City Girls
 Alan Bishop – bass guitar, vocals
 Richard Bishop – guitar, vocals
 Charles Gocher – drums, percussion, vocals

Production and additional personnel
 Scott Colburn – recording, editing
 Wade Olson – recording
 Manford Cain – recording
 Sun City Girls – musical arrangement, production, recording

Release history

References

External links 
 

1997 compilation albums
Sun City Girls albums